Walungu is a territory of South Kivu in the Democratic Republic of Congo 

It was the site of a plane crash on May 25, 2005 when a chartered Maniema Union Antonov An-28 aircraft, owned by Victoria Air, crashed into a mountain near Walungu, about 30 minutes after takeoff. All of the 22 passengers and 5 crew members were killed (see 2005 in aviation). Walungu Territory comprises a number of Groupments and Chefferie' notably Burhale Groupment, Ihembe Groupment, Mushinga Groupment and many more. UN Peacekeeping Force has also been employed to counter foreign armed groups and local militias which are committing HRVs (Human Rights Violations) while exploring minerals from the area.

References

External links
 http://www.afriline.net/aid-walungu-info-1383.asp Information concerning Walungu Aid, an NGO working in the Walungu area

Territories of South Kivu Province